Jan Jílek (born 5 June 1973) is a Czech football referee. He was a full international for FIFA from 2007 to 2010.

Career statistics
Statistics for Czech First League matches only.

References

External links
Jan Jílek on WorldReferee.com
Jan Jílek on rozhodci-cmfs.cz 
Jan Jílek on weltfussball.de 

1973 births
Living people
Czech football referees